Kudumba Gouravam is a 1958 Indian Tamil-language drama film directed by B. S. Ranga. The film stars Gemini Ganesan and Savithri. The film was a remake of 1957 Telugu film of same name also directed by B. S. Ranga.

Plot 

Kanagarathinam is the owner of Umaiyalpuram Farm. He has a son Gopal from his first marriage. Kannamma is his second wife and she has a son and a daughter. Sarala is Gopal's wife. The smooth-running family is disturbed by the arrival of Sankaralingam, a distant relative who claims that he is Kannamma's elder brother. He is an ace fraud and he swindles money from the farm. Gopal and Sarala are chased out of the farm house. Gopal vows to restore order and unity in the family. How he does that forms the rest of the story.

Cast 
List compiled from the database of Film News Anandan and from the film's song book.

Male cast
Gemini Ganesan as Gopal
K. Sarangapani as Kanagarathnam
Sayeeram
V. R. Rajagopal
C. P. Kittan

Female cast
Savithri as Sathya
P. Kannamba as Kannamma
E. V. Saroja as Sarala
Baby Uma
Prabhavathi

Supporting cast
Duraisamy
Thodi Kannan
Rajan
Kanniah
Balakrishnan

Production 
The film was produced and directed by B. S. Ranga. Screenplay was written by Udhayakumar. Cinematography was handled by B. N. Haridas while the editing was done by P. G. Mohan. Chopra, P. S. Gopalakrishnan and Ganesh Pillai were in charge of choreography. The film was shot and processed at Vikram Studios, Chennai.

Soundtrack 
Music was composed by the duo Viswanathan–Ramamoorthy while the lyrics were penned by A. Maruthakasi and Kannadasan. Playback singers are T. M. Soundararajan, A. L. Raghavan, P. B. Srinivas, P. Nageswara Rao, Sirkazhi Govindarajan, P. Leela, S. Janaki, P. Susheela, K. Jamuna Rani, L. R. Eswari, A. P. Komala and A. G. Rathnamala.
P. Susheela has sung "Thennavan Thaai Nattu" that is a pure Carnatic rendering. It's a Ragamaliga with ragas Reethigowlai, Khamas and Hamsavinodini combined. It's a treat to the ears.

References

External links 

1958 drama films
1958 films
Films scored by Viswanathan–Ramamoorthy
Indian black-and-white films
Indian drama films
Tamil remakes of Telugu films